Charles Tennyson d'Eyncourt (20 July 1784 – 21 July 1861), born Charles Tennyson, was a British politician, landowner and Member of Parliament for Stamford from 1831 to 1832 and for Lambeth from 1832 to 1852. He is also known for his social pretensions and his graceless behaviour towards his nephew, the poet Alfred Lord Tennyson. He was educated at St John's College, Cambridge.

Early life
He was the younger son of Elizabeth (née Clayton) Tennyson and George Tennyson, who bought the family seat of Bayons, in the village of Tealby, Lincolnshire, along with 2,000 acres (8 km²) of land, and came in time to own a large part of the village. His elder sister, Elizabeth Tennyson, was the wife of Matthew Russell, MP. At the age of 12, his elder brother George Clayton Tennyson was disinherited by their father, put into a career in the Church, and the family fortune was bestowed on Charles. As a result, there was bad blood between the Tennysons of Somersby, where his brother lived before his death, and the opulent Tennysons of Bayons, who considered themselves socially superior.

His mother was the daughter, and eventual heir, of John Turner of Caistor and claimed to be descended from the Lords of Lovel and d'Eyncourt, and also from King Edward III. His paternal grandparents were Michael Tennyson and Elizabeth (née Carlton) Tennyson.

Career

Upon his father's death at Usselby Hall in July 1835, Tennyson inherited the family estates and changed his family's name to Tennyson d'Eyncourt. A ruined castle was part of the property, and Charles wished to establish a noble lineage for himself with a title and a castle. Beacons was renamed Bayons, to make it sound like a Norman castle, and it was extensively enlarged and rebuilt in the style of a Gothic castellated manor-house.

Public life
For many years, he was MP for Lambeth, and was made a Privy Counsellor in 1832. Also in the 1830s, along with Augustus, Duke of Sussex and Admiral Sir Sidney Smith, he was one of the prime movers in a plan to have the Order of Knights Templar revived as a British order of chivalry. In this he failed, and he also failed during 1839–1841 in an attempt to revive the d'Eyncourt peerage for himself and his heirs. In February 1829 he was elected a Fellow of the Royal Society.

He published, in 1850 a book of poems, Eustace, in memory of his youngest and favourite son who had died abroad; it had the misfortune to appear at the same time as Tennyson's In Memoriam, and suffered greatly by the comparison. Charles thoroughly disapproved of the poetry of his nephew Alfred (Horrid rubbish indeed . . . a discredit to British taste), and the latter's appointment as Poet Laureate in the same year and subsequent offer of a baronetcy caused him outrage and chagrin. He did not live long enough to have to endure a 'Somersby Tennyson' being elevated to the peerage.

Personal life
On 1 January 1808, Tennyson was married to Frances Mary Hutton, the only child and heiress of the Rev. John Hutton, Rector of Lea. Together, they were the parents of five sons and three daughters:

 George Hildeyard Tennyson D'Eyncourt (1809–1871), who did not marry.
 Edwin Clayton Tennyson d'Eyncourt (1813–1903), who entered the Royal Navy and became an Admiral; he married Lady Henrietta Pelham-Clinton, a daughter of Henry Pelham-Clinton, 4th Duke of Newcastle.
 Louis Charles Tennyson D'Eyncourt (1814–1896), who married Sophia Yates, a daughter of John Ashton Yates, MP for Carlow County; they lived at Hadley House in Middlesex.
 Eustace Alexander Tennyson D'Eyncourt (1816–1842), his favorite son who died unmarried in Barbados of yellow fever.
 Ellen Elizabeth Tennyson D'Eyncourt (1817–1900), who married Henry Mill Bunbury of Marlston House, High Sheriff of Berkshire.
 William Henry Tennyson D'Eyncourt (1819–1819), who died in infancy.
 Julia Frances Tennyson D'Eyncourt (d. 1879), who became a nun at Princethorpe in 1852.
 Clara Maria Tennyson D'Eyncourt (d. 1863), who married John Hinde Palmer, MP for Lincoln, in 1849.

Tennyson d'Eyncourt died on 21 July 1861. His widow died in January 1878.

Descendants
The Tennyson d'Eyncourt family eventually gained its baronetcy at the beginning of the 20th century and still continues. The most significant member of the family was the naval architect Sir Eustace Tennyson d'Eyncourt (1868–1951), the First Baronet, who was the Royal Navy's Director of Naval Construction in the first decades of the 20th century.

References

External links 
 
 
 
 Charles Tennyson d'Eyncourt (1784-1861), Politician; MP for Stamford and Lambeth at the National Portrait Gallery, London

1784 births
Tennyson d'Eyncourt, Charles
Tennyson d'Eyncourt, Charles
Tennyson d'Eyncourt, Charles
Tennyson d'Eyncourt, Charles
Tennyson d'Eyncourt, Charles
Tennyson d'Eyncourt, Charles
Tennyson d'Eyncourt, Charles
Tennyson d'Eyncourt, Charles
Tennyson d'Eyncourt, Charles
Tennyson d'Eyncourt, Charles
Fellows of the Royal Society
Politics of the London Borough of Lambeth
Members of the Privy Council of the United Kingdom
UK MPs 1818–1820
UK MPs 1820–1826
Charles
Alumni of St John's College, Cambridge
People from West Lindsey District